Alaena rosei is a butterfly in the family Lycaenidae. It is found in Angola, where it is only known from the area near Gabela and the vicinity of Lubango.

References

Butterflies described in 1980
Alaena
Endemic fauna of Angola
Butterflies of Africa